Mia C. Costello (born January 11, 1968) is a Republican member of the Alaska Senate from District K. She previously served from 2011 to 2015 in the Alaska House of Representatives, representing the 20th District.

In November 2010, Costello defeated Democratic incumbent Bob Buch to win her House seat. Costello received 3,696 votes to Buch's 2,873. Costello served on the House Finance Committee and as chair of the Natural Resources Finance Subcommittee. She ran for the Senate seat vacated by Democrat Hollis French in 2014, picking up the seat to add to the Republican Senate Majority.

Prior to being elected to the Alaska State House, Costello worked as a school teacher, legislative aide, and as deputy communications director for Governor Frank Murkowski.

After graduating from West High School, she earned her B.A. from Harvard University and later a Master of Art in Teaching from the University of Alaska Southeast.

References

External links
Alaska State Legislature - Representative Mia Costello official government website
 Mia Costello at 100 Years of Alaska's Legislature

1968 births
21st-century American women politicians
21st-century American politicians
Republican Party Alaska state senators
Harvard University alumni
Living people
Republican Party members of the Alaska House of Representatives
Politicians from Anchorage, Alaska
University of Alaska Southeast alumni
Women state legislators in Alaska